Gorontalo is a city and the capital of the Gorontalo Province, Indonesia. It is on the island of Sulawesi. The city has an area of 79.59 km2 and had a population of 179,991 at the 2010 census and 198,539 at the 2020 census; the official estimate as at mid 2021 was 199,788.

Geography 
Gorontalo shares its borders with Bone Bolango Regency (to the north and east), Tomini Gulf (to the south), and Gorontalo Regency (to the west).

Administrative Districts 
As the time of the 2010 census, the city was divided into six districts (kecamatan), and an additional three districts were subsequently created by the splitting of existing districts. The districts are tabulated below with their areas and their populations at the 2010 census and the 2020 census, together with the official estimates as at mid 2021. The table also includes the locations of the district administrative centres, the number of administrative villages (rural desa and urban kelurahan) in each district, and its postal codes.

Note: (a) the population in 2010 of the three newly created districts is included in the figures for the districts from which they were created.

Climate
Gorontalo has a relatively dry tropical rainforest climate (Köppen Af) with moderate rainfall year-round.

Infrastructure 
The largest hospital on Gorontalo is the Aloei Saboe Hospital.

Culinary
Cuisine in Gorontalo range from seafood to corn (as these can be easily found). Famous food "binthe Biluhuta" which is made out of corn, shredded coconut, basil, and some fish or dried prawns. Other than that, grilled tuna with chilly sauce is very popular.

Sister cities 
 Mamuju, Indonesia
 Bengkulu City, Indonesia

References

External links 

 

 
1728 establishments in Asia